is a 2009 Japanese film.

Story
Based on the true story of Asahiyama Zoo in Hokkaido, the northernmost zoo in Japan. The unpopular zoo welcomes a new zoo keeper, young Yoshida (Yasuhi Nakamura), who has more affection for insects than people after years of being bullied at school when he was young. Yoshida soon realizes that Asahiyama Zoo is facing a financial crisis and the zoo director Takizawa has been doing everything in his power to save the zoo from closing down.

Moved by Takizawa's passion, Yoshida and other zoo keepers came to share the zoo director's belief that one's dreams can come true, and together they tackle this seemingly impossible task of revitalizing Asahiyama. A breakthrough arrives in the form of "Behavioral Exhibition," a method that is pioneered by Ashiyama's zoo keepers and which eventually makes the zoo renowned throughout the world.

Cast
 Toshiyuki Nishida as the zoo director Takizawa 
 Yasuhi Nakamura as Bando Gen.
 Ai Maeda as Makoto Ogawa
 Keiko Horiuchi as Sanae Ikeuchi
 Takashi Sasano as Saburō Isogai
 Zen Kajiwara as Tokuya Mitamura
 Hisako Manda as Hatoko Hiraga
 Sansei Shiomi as Genta Tobe
 Naomasa Musaka as Teruo Mitani
 Hiroyuki Nagato as Keisuke Nirasaki
 Ittoku Kishibe as Seinosuke Yanagihara
 Akira Emoto as Itsurō Usui
 Mitsuru Fukikoshi
 Yūki Amami
 Taro Ishida
 Houka Kinoshita
 Akaji Maro
 Junichi Haruta

Staff
 Director: Masahiko Makino
 Writer: Koshimizu Yasuhiro
 Music: Ryudo Uzaki, Haseo Nakanishi
 Committee members Producers: Kadokawa Pictures, NTT DoCoMo, Japan Film Fund
 Distributor: Kadokawa Pictures

Theme Song
「夢になりたい」("I want to dream") 谷村新司 Tanimura Shinji (songwriter: Tanimura Shinji Arrangement: Yoshiharu Setoya)

References

External links
 
 Kadokawa Pictures 
 

Kadokawa Daiei Studio films
Films set in amusement parks
Films about animals
Films about penguins
2009 films
2000s Japanese films
2000s Japanese-language films